Failure is the debut album of The Posies.  It was first released independently in 1988 on cassette only.  In 1989 it was reissued on cassette, LP and CD on PopLlama Records.

Due to playing time restrictions imposed by the LP manufacturer the band was forced to drop one song from the PopLlama LP edition. The CD version had no time restrictions and includes the same content as the cassette.

It was later remastered and reissued again in 2004 on Houston Party Records. "I May Hate You Sometimes" appears in Children of Nuggets: Original Artyfacts from the Second Psychedelic Era, 1976–1995, and was also featured in the 2000 Daria telemovie Is It Fall Yet? as the ending-credits song.

Track listing
All songs by Jon Auer and Ken Stringfellow.
"Blind Eyes Open"  – 3:55 
"The Longest Line"   – 3:12 
"Under Easy"   – 3:25 
"Like Me Too"  – 3:35 
"I May Hate You Sometimes"   – 3:20 
"Ironing Tuesdays"  – 2:56 
"Paint Me"   – 4:05 
"Believe in Something Other (Than Yourself)"  – 4:10      
"Compliment?"  – 3:22 
"At Least for Now"   – 3:33 
"Uncombined"  – 4:00 (not included on the PopLlama LP edition)
"What Little Remains"  – 2:50

Bonus tracks (15th Anniversary edition) 
 "I May Hate You Sometimes" - Demo
 "Paint Me" - Demo
 "Like Me Too" - Demo
 "Allison Hubbard" - Instrumental
 "After May A Summer Dies a Swan" - Instrumental
 "Blind Eyes Open" - Instrumental Demo
 "I May Hate You Sometimes" - Alternative Version
 "Compliment?" - Alternative Version

Personnel
Credits adapted from discogs
The Posies
 Jon Auer - guitar, vocals, piano
 Ken Stringfellow - guitar, bass, vocals
Production
The Posies - producer 
John Golden - mastering
Chris McClurken, Ken Stringfellow - engineer (additional), mixing (additional) 
Jon Auer - engineer, mixing
Artwork and Design
Beau Fredericks - design, cover art 
Jill Goodejohn - photography

References 

1988 debut albums
The Posies albums
PopLlama Records albums